Ernest Vajda (born Ernő Vajda; 27 May 1886 in Komárno, Austria-Hungary, today Slovakia – 3 April 1954 in Woodland Hills, California) was a Hungarian actor, playwright, and novelist, but is more famous today for his screenplays.

He co-wrote the screenplay for the film Smilin' Through (1932), based on the hit play by Jane Cowl and Jane Murfin. Vajda also wrote the screenplay for the first film version of Rudolph Besier's The Barretts of Wimpole Street (1934).

Partial filmography
 The Unknown Tomorrow (1923)
 The Crown of Lies (1926)
 You Never Know Women (1926) original story
 Service for Ladies (1927) original story "The Head Waiter"
 The Woman on Trial (1927)
 Manhattan Cocktail (1928) original story
 A Night of Mystery (1928)
 Manhattan Cowboy (1928)
 The Love Parade (1929)
 Monte Carlo (1930)
 The Smiling Lieutenant (1931)
 The Guardsman (1931)
 Tonight or Never (1931)
 Service for Ladies (1932) original story "The Head Waiter"
 Payment Deferred (1932)
 Monsieur Albert (1932) original story "The Head Waiter"
 Broken Lullaby (1932)
 The Barretts of Wimpole Street (1934)
 The Merry Widow (1934)
 A Woman Rebels (1936)
 The Great Garrick (1937)
 Marie Antoinette (1938)
 Dramatic School (1938)
 He Stayed for Breakfast (1940)
 Smilin' Through (1941)
 Stars and Stripes Forever (1952)

External links
 Ernest Vajda at the Film Reference
 
 New York Times bio

1886 births
1954 deaths
Male screenwriters
Hungarian male writers
20th-century Hungarian screenwriters
Austro-Hungarian emigrants to the United States